U13  may refer to:
 German submarine U-13, several vessels
 Nissan Bluebird (U13), a four-door sedan car series launched in Japan in September 1991
 Yamaha ASEAN Cup U-13 Football, a football tournament for under 13 level involving ASEAN countries
 In software development, u13 refers to users under the age of 13.